Oyston is a surname. Notable people with the surname include:

Owen Oyston (born 1934), English businessman and owner of Blackpool F.C.
His son, Karl Oyston (born 1968), former chairman of Blackpool F.C.
Charles Oyston (1869–1942), English cricketer